Aaron Black (born 29 November 1990) is a former professional Australian rules footballer who played for the North Melbourne Football Club and the Geelong Football Club in the Australian Football League (AFL). He was recruited by North Melbourne with the twenty-fifth selection in the 2009 national draft and he made his senior debut in round 24 of the 2011 season against . In 2016, he spent the entire season in the Victorian Football League (VFL) and at the end of the season, he mutually agreed with North Melbourne to seek opportunities at another club despite being contracted to North Melbourne until the end of 2017. He was officially traded to Geelong in October. Black was delisted after 2018 though in 2019 he became part of the coaching team for the inaugural Geelong Cats AFLW side and also was named co-captain of the club's VFL outfit.

Statistics
 Statistics are correct to the end of 2018

|- style="background-color: #EAEAEA"
! scope="row" style="text-align:center" | 2010
|
| 35 || 0 || – || – || – || – || – || – || – || – || – || – || – || – || – || – || 0
|-
! scope="row" style="text-align:center" | 2011
|
| 35 || 1 || 1 || 0 || 5 || 4 || 9 || 3 || 0 || 1.0 || 0.0 || 5.0 || 4.0 || 9.0 || 3.0 || 0.0 || 0
|- style="background-color: #EAEAEA"
! scope="row" style="text-align:center" | 2012
|
| 35 || 3 || 3 || 1 || 10 || 13 || 23 || 8 || 6 || 1.0 || 0.3 || 3.3 || 4.3 || 7.7 || 2.7 || 2.0 || 0
|-
! scope="row" style="text-align:center" | 2013
|
| 35 || 18 || 33 || 23 || 144 || 105 || 249 || 86 || 43 || 1.8 || 1.3 || 8.0 || 5.8 || 13.8 || 4.8 || 2.4 || 0
|- style="background-color: #EAEAEA"
! scope="row" style="text-align:center" | 2014
|
| 35 || 25 || 26 || 23 || 165 || 89 || 254 || 110 || 51 || 1.0 || 0.9 || 6.6 || 3.6 || 10.2 || 4.4 || 2.0 || 0
|-
! scope="row" style="text-align:center" | 2015
|
| 35 || 3 || 1 || 1 || 14 || 12 || 26 || 7 || 4 || 0.3 || 0.3 || 4.7 || 4.0 || 8.7 || 2.3 || 1.3 || 0
|- style="background-color: #EAEAEA"
! scope="row" style="text-align:center" | 2016
|
| 35 || 0 || – || – || – || – || – || – || – || – || – || – || – || – || – || – || 0
|-
! scope="row" style="text-align:center" | 2017
|
| 23 || 4 || 5 || 2 || 35 || 28 || 63 || 21 || 11 || 0.3 || 0.3 || 4.7 || 4.0 || 8.7 || 2.3 || 1.3 || 0
|- style="background-color: #EAEAEA"
! scope="row" style="text-align:center" | 2018
|
| 23 || 3 || 0 || 0 || 19 || 15 || 34 || 15 || 7 || 0.0 || 0.0 || 9.5 || 7.5 || 17.0 || 7.5 || 3.5 || 
|- class="sortbottom"
! colspan=3| Career
! 57
! 69
! 50
! 392
! 266
! 658
! 250
! 122
! 1.2
! 0.9
! 7.0
! 4.8
! 11.8
! 4.5
! 2.2
! 0
|}

References

External links

  

1990 births
Living people
North Melbourne Football Club players
Australian rules footballers from Western Australia
Peel Thunder Football Club players
Eaton Boomers Football Club players
North Ballarat Football Club players
Werribee Football Club players
Geelong Football Club players